The Duane Arnold Energy Center (DAEC) was Iowa's only nuclear power plant.

DAEC entered operation in February 1975. On August 10, 2020, the plant cooling towers were damaged during a derecho, and repairs were deemed uneconomical, as the plant had already been scheduled for decommissioning in October 2020.

The operator and majority owner is NextEra Energy Resources (70%). The Central Iowa Power Cooperative owns 20% and the Corn Belt Power Cooperative owns 10%.

In January 2018, NextEra Energy announced that it was unlikely that DAEC would operate beyond 2025. The plant was given a 20-year license extension to 2034 but considered closing after Alliant Energy, which contracts for 70% of the plant's electricity, announced it would instead be buying electricity from subsidized sources such as wind and natural gas. In July 2018 the expected closure date was amended to October 2020.

The unit permanently ceased making power on 10 August 2020, due to storm damage from the August 2020 Midwest derecho. An NRC report of the incident stated that "the vacuum drawn in secondary containment by the standby gas treatment system was slightly below the technical specification (TS) limit", indicating that the secondary containment system might not have been fully effective had it been challenged.  Thus the incident was considered by nuclear safety experts to be "a close call".

Electricity Production 
During last full year of operation in 2019, Duane Arnold generated 5,235 GWh of electricity.

History
In the late 1960s, Iowa Electric Light & Power Co. (now Alliant Energy – West), Central Iowa Power Cooperative and Corn Belt Power Cooperative applied for a nuclear plant license with the Atomic Energy Commission (AEC). On June 17, 1970 a construction permit was granted and work began.  The original plan was to complete construction in 40 months at an estimated cost of $250 million.

The energy center was named after Duane Arnold who grew up in Sanborn, Iowa. Arnold was educated at Grinnell College and went to work for Iowa Electric Light and Power Company in 1946. At the time of his death in 1983, at the age of 65, he was chairman of the board and CEO of that company, marrying along the way the daughter, Henrietta, of the previous chairman Sutherland Dows.  Arnold was very committed to nuclear energy despite the controversy surrounding that source of energy, and oversaw the construction and opening in 1974 of the plant that bears his name.  “In my opinion, nuclear power is the most beneficial method of anything we could possibly do to provide energy to our customers in the future,” Mr. Arnold stated in a 1979 interview with the Des Moines Register, about a month after the Three Mile Island accident. 

Construction was completed and the reactor reached initial criticality on March 23, 1974. The cost was $50 million over budget. Commercial operations began on February 1, 1975.  The plant was licensed for 1,658 MWt. However, power operations were restricted to 1593MWt (about 535 MWe) until plant modifications were completed in 1985 to utilize the full licensed capacity.

In May 2000, the NRC granted a license transfer of the DAEC to Nuclear Management Company LLC (NMC).  Ownership of the plant remained with Alliant, Central Iowa Power Cooperative and Corn Belt Power Cooperative, but NMC would manage the operation of the plant.

In 2001, a power uprate was approved by the NRC to 1,912 MWt.  Scheduled outages since that time have added modifications to the plant that have allowed this power level to be sustained without restrictions or challenges to nuclear or industrial safety.

On January 27, 2006, FPL Energy (a subsidiary of FPL Group) closed the sale transaction of 70 percent ownership from Alliant Energy-Interstate Power and Light. FPL Energy (now NextEra Energy Resources) also took control of the operations of the plant from NMC.

DAEC remained online during the 2008 Iowa Flood, when other power plants along the Cedar River shut down. Practice drills for radiological emergencies from the plant allowed the Linn County Emergency Management Agency to better respond to the flooding.

In December 2010, the Nuclear Regulatory Commission granted Duane Arnold a 20-year extension license lasting until 2034, taking the plant beyond the life of its original 40-year operating permit.

In July 2018, NextEra and Alliant Energy agreed to shorten their power purchase agreement by five years in return for a $110 million buyout payment from Alliant, making the expected closure date 2020.

Plant equipment
DAEC has a single GE BWR-4 reactor with a Mark I containment. Twenty-four mechanical draft cooling towers utilized water from the Cedar River as a heat sink. Facilities exist to process all contaminated water onsite and the DAEC operates with a "zero release" policy to not discharge any contaminated water back to the Cedar River. Facilities exist on site for dry storage of spent fuel with capacity for the entire life of the plant (including license renewal).

The site is scheduled for a 200 MW label capacity solar park with a 75 MW / 300 MWh (4-hour) battery by 2024. Lazard estimates that the wholesale price of replacement electricity will be $0.04/kWh, but a more realistic estimate that takes account of the 11.4% cost of capital reported by NextEra puts the wholesale price at $0.21/kWh, not including operating and decommissioning costs.

Known Problems
The Mark I containment was undersized in the original design; the Nuclear Regulatory Commission's Harold Denton estimated a 90% probability of explosive failure if the pressure containment system were ever needed in a severe accident. This design flaw may have been the reason that the tsunami in 2011 led to explosions and fire in Fukushima Daiichi nuclear disaster.

Accident Analysis
In 2010, the Nuclear Regulatory Commission estimated that the risk of an earthquake causing core damage to the reactor at Duane Arnold was 1 in 31,250 each year.

In 2013, in response to the Fukushima Daiichi nuclear disaster, the Nuclear Regulatory Commission ordered Duane Arnold "to install a reliable hardened venting capability for pre-core damage and under severe accident conditions, including those involving a breach of the reactor vessel by molten core debris" due to the similarity in reactor design.

Community impact
DAEC employs hundreds of people in the Cedar Rapids area. Some of these workers are represented by the International Brotherhood of Electrical Workers, others by Security, Police and Fire Professionals of America.

Emergency warning towers are maintained by DAEC and provide a means for tornado warnings as well as plant emergencies. The Emergency Planning organization at DAEC works with local, county, and state officials to maintain an emergency plan. The emergency plan can be found in the front of area phonebooks. Drills are conducted on a regular basis in accordance with requirements from the Nuclear Regulatory Commission (NRC) and the Federal Emergency Management Agency (FEMA).

Tax revenues from DAEC amount to about 1% of the total revenues for Linn County, Iowa. Pleasant Creek Reservoir, a  lake, was developed by Alliant Energy and the Iowa Conservation Commission to provide a recreation area and act as a source of cooling water during times of low flow in the Cedar River.

The remainder is leased to farmers for crop production or is left in its natural habitat.

In 2014, the Nuclear Energy Institute released a study showing the positive impact of DAEC on the economy and environment. Key findings are listed below.
 DAEC employs nearly 600 full-time workers that earn more than double the average pay amount of workers in Benton County and approximately 55 percent more than those in Linn County
 DAEC contributes $246 million of economic activity locally and contributes approximately $255 million to Iowa's economy each year
 For every dollar DAEC spent, the Iowa economy produced $1.27
 DAEC produces more than 1,100 direct and secondary jobs
 DAEC's operation helps avoid the emission of nearly 4 million tons of carbon dioxide annually, which is the equivalent of taking almost 800,000 cars off the road

Surrounding population

The 2010 U.S. population within  of Duane Arnold was 107,880, an increase of 8.2 percent in a decade, according to an analysis of U.S. Census data for msnbc.com. The 2010 U.S. population within  was 658,634, an increase of 7.1 percent since 2000. Cities within 50 miles include Cedar Rapids (10 miles to city center).

References

External links

Florida Power & Light web page on Duane Arnold
Pictures
Central Iowa Power Cooperative

Energy infrastructure completed in 1975
Buildings and structures in Linn County, Iowa
Energy in Iowa
NextEra Energy
Nuclear power plants in Iowa
1975 establishments in Iowa
Former nuclear power stations in the United States